Akhlan Terich is a town, in Chitral District in the Khyber Pakhtunkhwa province of Pakistan.

See also
 Tirich Mir

References

Chitral District
Tehsils of Chitral District
Union councils of Khyber Pakhtunkhwa
Populated places in Chitral District
Union councils of Chitral District